Julia Görges and Oksana Kalashnikova were the defending champions, but chose not to defend their title together. Görges played alongside Petra Martić whereas Kalashnikova played with Marta Sirotkina.

Kalashnikova and Sirotkina lost in the semifinals to Görges and Martić.

Görges and Martić won in the final, beating Sania Mirza and Vladimíra Uhlířová 6-4, 7-6(7).

Seeds

  Sania Mirza /  Vladimíra Uhlířová (final)
  Julia Görges /  Petra Martić (champions)
  Vitalia Diatchenko /  Alexandra Panova (first round)
  Sandra Klemenschits /  Tatjana Malek (first round)

Draw

Draw

References
 http://www.itftennis.com/womens/tournaments/tournamentresults.asp?event=1100130045&tournament=1100023127

Al Habtoor Tennis Challenge - Doubles
Al Habtoor Tennis Challenge
2010 in Emirati tennis